The Queen Elizabeth Central Hospital (QECH), is a tertiary referral and teaching hospital in Malawi, situated in Blantyre. It provides care to the surrounding district hospitals, health clinics, and private medical facilities. Officially, the hospital has 1350 beds available. In 1958, the hospital was given Queen Elizabeth II's name.

References 

Hospitals in Malawi